Paul Gordon Wintz (born 7 March 1986) is a Guyanese cricketer who has played for the Guyanese national side in West Indian domestic cricket, and also for the Guyana Amazon Warriors franchise in the Caribbean Premier League (CPL). He is a right-arm fast-medium bowler.

Wintz was born in Cumberland Village, in Guyana's East Berbice-Corentyne region. He made his senior debut for Guyana at the 2010 Champions League Twenty20 in India, playing matches against the Mumbai Indians and South Australia. Wintz made his List A debut for Guyana during the 2011–12 Regional Super50, and his first-class debut during the 2012–13 Regional Four Day Competition. At the 2012–13 Regional Super50, he took eight wickets from six matches, behind only Ronsford Beaton for Guyana.

References

External links
Player profile and statistics at CricketArchive
Player profile and statistics at ESPNcricinfo

1986 births
Living people
Guyana cricketers
Guyana Amazon Warriors cricketers
Guyanese cricketers
People from East Berbice-Corentyne